Hitteen Sporting Club is a Palestinen football club based in Nablus, Palestine. The club was founded in 1959. that participates in the West Bank Second League, They use the stadium of Nablus.

History
Hitteen Sports Club, one of the oldest Palestinian clubs, based in Nablus.
The club was established in 1959 AD in the city of Nablus, and the activity stopped for long periods due to the conditions that prevailed in Palestine during the British Mandate and because of the Nakba and the setback, the activity began on 10/18-1959 AD.

The idea of establishing the Hittin Scouts Club arose from some young men from the city of Nablus, and the Jordanian Scouts and Girl Guides Association proposed a license on October 18, 1959, according to which the Scouting Law is permitted and its division guarantees honesty, sincerity, trust, screen, and discipline. Compassionate, obedience, comfort, patience, courage, as well as public assistance, so that the boy becomes a young man who does his duty towards God. Spain, Turkey, France and Germany, by Autostop.

Honours

League
Premier League
 Runners-up (1) : 1983-84'''

References

External links

List of football clubs in Palestine

Football clubs in the West Bank
Association football clubs established in 1959
Nablus